Antennexocentrus is a genus of beetles in the family Cerambycidae, containing the following species:

 Antennexocentrus bremeri Breuning, 1982
 Antennexocentrus collarti Breuning, 1957

References

Acanthocinini